In seismology, a tsunami earthquake is an earthquake which triggers a tsunami of significantly greater magnitude, as measured by shorter-period seismic waves. The term was introduced by Japanese seismologist Hiroo Kanamori in 1972. Such events are a result of relatively slow rupture velocities. They are particularly dangerous as a large tsunami may arrive at a coastline with little or no warning.

Characteristics
The distinguishing feature for a tsunami earthquake is that the release of seismic energy occurs at long periods (low frequencies) relative to typical tsunamigenic earthquakes. Earthquakes of this type do not generally show the peaks of seismic wave activity associated with ordinary events. A tsunami earthquake can be defined as an undersea earthquake for which the surface wave magnitude Ms differs markedly from the moment magnitude Mw, because the former is calculated from surface waves with a period of about 20 seconds, whereas the latter is a measure of the total energy release at all frequencies. The displacements associated with tsunami earthquakes are consistently greater than those associated with ordinary tsunamigenic earthquakes of the same moment magnitude, typically more than double. Rupture velocities for tsunami earthquakes are typically about 1.0 km per second, compared to the more normal 2.5–3.5 km per second for other megathrust earthquakes. These slow rupture speeds lead to greater directivity, with the potential to cause higher run-ups on short coastal sections. Tsunami earthquakes mainly occur at subduction zones where there is a large accretionary wedge or where sediments are being subducted, as this weaker material leads to the slower rupture velocities.

Cause
Analysis of tsunami earthquakes such as the 1946 Aleutian Islands earthquake shows that the release of seismic moment takes place at an unusually long period. Calculations of the effective moment derived from surface waves show a rapid increase with decrease in the frequency of the seismic waves, whereas for ordinary earthquakes it remains almost constant with frequency. The duration over which the seabed is deformed has little effect on the size of the resultant tsunami for times up to several minutes. The observation of long period energy release is consistent with unusually slow rupture propagation velocities. Slow rupture velocities are linked to propagation through relatively weak material, such as poorly consolidated sedimentary rocks. Most tsunami earthquakes have been linked to rupture within the uppermost part of a subduction zone, where an accretionary wedge is developed in the hanging wall of the megathrust. Tsunami earthquakes have also been linked to the presence of a thin layer of subducted sedimentary rock along the uppermost part of the plate interface, as is thought to be present in areas of significant topography at the top of the oceanic crust, and where propagation was in an up-dip direction, possibly reaching the seafloor.

Identifying tsunami earthquakes
Standard methods of giving early warnings for tsunamis rely on data that will not typically identify a tsunami earthquake as tsunamigenic and therefore fail to predict possibly damaging tsunamis.

Examples

1896 Sanriku

On 15 June 1896 the Sanriku coast was struck by a devastating tsunami with a maximum wave height of 38.2 m, which caused more than 22,000 deaths. The residents of the coastal towns and villages were taken completely by surprise because the tsunami had only been preceded by a relatively weak shock. The magnitude of the tsunami has been estimated as Mt=8.2 while the earthquake shaking only indicated a magnitude of Ms=7.2. This discrepancy in magnitude requires more than just a slow rupture velocity. Modelling of tsunami generation that takes into account additional uplift associated with deformation of the softer sediments of the accretionary wedge caused by horizontal movement of the 'backstop' in the overriding plate has successfully explained the discrepancy, estimating a magnitude of Mw=8.0–8.1.

1992 Nicaragua

The 1992 Nicaragua earthquake was the first tsunami earthquake to be recorded with a broad-band seismic network.

2004 Indian Ocean 
On 26 December 2004, a major earthquake with an magnitude of 9.1-9.3 Mw struck with an epicenter off the coast of Sumatra, Indonesia. Scientifically known as the Sumatra-Andaman Earthquake, reached a Mercalli intensity upto IX in some areas. The earthquake was the third-largest ever recorded, based upon seismographic measurements.

This earthquake ultimately caused a disastrous tsunami, with massive waves up to 30m high. Popularly known as the Boxing Day Tsunami, after the Boxing Day holiday, devastated communities along the surrounding coasts of the Indian Ocean, killing an estimated 227,898 people in 14 countries. It is one of the deadliest natural disasters recorded in history.

Other tsunami earthquakes
 1605 Nankai earthquake
 1677 Bōsō earthquake
 1771 Great Yaeyama earthquake
 1791 Okinawa earthquake
 1907 Sumatra earthquake
 April 1923 Kamchatka earthquake and tsunami
 1934 Santa Cruz earthquake
 1932 Jalisco earthquakes
 1946 Aleutian Islands earthquake
 November 1960 Peru earthquake
 1963 Kuril Islands earthquake
 1975 Kuril Islands earthquake
 1982 Tonga earthquake
 1994 Java earthquake
 1996 Chimbote earthquake
 2002 Guerrero earthquake — A  6.7 earthquake off the coast of Mexico failed to trigger country's earthquake warning system due to its extremely low peak acceleration. The near-trench earthquake ruptured the Guerrero Gap and may have generated an anomalously large tsunami.
 2006 Pangandaran earthquake and tsunami
 2010 Mentawai earthquake and tsunami
 2012 El Salvador earthquake
2015 Torishima earthquake — A moderate  5.7 earthquake near Tori-shima generated waves with a maximum amplitude of 0.5 meters at Hachijō-jima.
2021 South Sandwich Islands earthquakes

See also
Kaikoura Canyon landslide tsunami hazard

References

Further reading

Earthquake
Tsunami earthquakes